Mountain artillery, which includes pack howitzers, mountain howitzers and mountain guns, is designed to accompany mountain infantry forces.  Usually lightweight and designed to be broken down to be portable by pack animals or even soldiers, they often are in limited calibres with low muzzle energy.  Correspondingly, range and anti-armor capabilities are limited.  However, they can deliver useful firepower in locations that may be inaccessible to heavier support forces.

Notes and references

 
Mountain